Seo Ji-hoon (born April 25, 1997) is a South Korean actor. Since his acting debut with Signal in 2016,  Seo has appeared in dramas such as Solomon's Perjury (2016–2017), School 2017 (2017), and My First Love (2018).

Career
Seo debuted as an actor in 2016, which he took a minor role in the drama Signal as the main culprit in the Inju female student case. Then he was cast in the web-drama Matching! Boys Archery.
Seo received his first KBS Drama Award nomination for his role in the one-act drama The Legendary Shuttle. Later that year he starred in the mystery teen drama Solomon's Perjury.

In 2017, Seo starred in the teen drama School 2017, and featured in the black comedy series Prison Playbook.

In 2018, Seo was cast in the fantasy romance drama My First Love as the younger version of Lee Jung-shin's character. He then played the younger version of the character Im Tae-kyung in the mystery drama Misty. In May, Seo was cast in the fantasy romance drama Tale of Fairy  alongside Moon Chae-won and Yoon Hyun-min.

In 2019, Seo was cast in his first leading role in the tvN one-act drama Drama Stage: Crumbling Friendship.  The same year, Seo was cast in the youth historical drama Flower Crew: Joseon Marriage Agency.

In 2020, Seo starred in the romantic comedy Men Are Men alongside Hwang Jung-eum and Yoon Hyun-min. He won a KBS Drama Award for his roles in Welcome and Men Are Men.

Filmography

Television series

Web series

Awards and nominations

References

External links 
 

1997 births
Living people
21st-century South Korean male actors
Kyung Hee University alumni
People from Daegu
South Korean male television actors